The 1961 Los Angeles Angels season ended with the Angels finishing 8th in the American League with a record of 70–91, 38½ games behind the World Champion New York Yankees. It was the Angels' first season in franchise history, and their only season at Wrigley Field in Los Angeles. Gene Autry owned the franchise, which was created as a counterpart to the Los Angeles Dodgers, and the two teams would even share the same stadium the following year when the Angels moved to Dodger Stadium (referring to as Chavez Ravine).

Offseason 
The Angels, along with the new Washington Senators, were the first ever American League expansion teams. Both teams participated in Major League Baseball's first ever expansion draft. The Angels had the first pick in the 1960 Major League Baseball expansion draft, which they used to select Eli Grba from the New York Yankees. Grba wound up playing two-plus seasons for Los Angeles before returning to the minor leagues.

Notable transactions 
 December 14, 1960: 1960 Major League Baseball expansion draft
Jim Fregosi was drafted by the Angels from the Boston Red Sox.
Bob Cerv was drafted by the Angels from the New York Yankees.
Steve Bilko was drafted by the Angels from the Detroit Tigers.
Earl Averill, Jr. was drafted by the Angels from the Chicago White Sox.
Jim McAnany was drafted by the Angels from the Chicago White Sox.
 December 29, 1960: Del Rice was signed as a free agent by the Angels.

Regular season 
As an expansion team, the Angels were not expected to do well. However, they not only finished ahead of the Senators, but also the Kansas City A's, who tied the Senators for last place, nine games behind Los Angeles.

Season standings

Opening Day starting lineup
The first game in franchise history took place at Memorial Stadium, Baltimore, on Tuesday, April 11, 1961.  Powered by Ted Kluszewski's first- and second-inning home runs, which accounted for five runs, and Grba's complete game six-hitter, the Angels defeated the Baltimore Orioles, 7–2. They would then lose eight games in a row, including their home opener April 27 against the Minnesota Twins at Wrigley Field, Los Angeles.

Record vs. opponents

Offense 
The Angels were no stranger to offense in their first season, with five players hitting 20 or more home runs, a mark which at the time was considered a remarkable feat. Leon Wagner, who led the team with 28 home runs, was one of the team's best offensive threats, also leading the team by slugging .517. The other players who hit 20 home runs were Ken Hunt (25), Lee Thomas (24), Earl Averill, Jr. (21), and Steve Bilko (20). Albie Pearson, who led the team in batting average, had an on-base percentage of .420, also a mark that was considered more valuable than the current game. Pearson led the team in several other offensive categories, leading the team in stolen bases (11), runs (92), and walks (96). Lee Thomas, who ended the season second on the team in batting at .284, led the team in hits, with 128, edging out Wagner by 1 hit.

Pitching 
Ken McBride, who led the team with 12 wins, also led the team with 15 losses. Eli Grba had an 11–13 record, good enough for second in both wins and losses amongst the team's pitchers. Ted Bowsfield was the Angels' only starter with a winning record, going 11–8. McBride had 180 strikeouts, 75 more than Grba, who was second on the team with 105. As a team, the Angels led the American League, throwing more strikeouts than any of the other 9 teams. Art Fowler and Tom Morgan were the Angels' top two in saves, with 11 and 10, respectively, leading the team to finish second in the American League in that category.

Notable transactions 
 April 1, 1961: Jim McAnany was traded by the Angels to the Chicago Cubs for Lou Johnson.
 April 7, 1961: Ray Semproch was purchased by the Angels from the Washington Senators.
 May 8, 1961: Bob Cerv and Tex Clevenger were traded by the Angels to the New York Yankees for Lee Thomas, Ryne Duren, and Johnny James.
 May 26, 1961: Art Fowler was purchased by the Angels from the Los Angeles Dodgers.
 July 22, 1961: Tom Satriano was signed as an amateur free agent by the Angels.
 September 8, 1961: Chuck Tanner was purchased by the Angels from the Dallas-Fort Worth Rangers.

Roster

Player stats

Batting

Starters by position 
Note: Pos = Position; G = Games played; AB = At bats; H = Hits; Avg. = Batting average; HR = Home runs; RBI = Runs batted in

Other batters 
Note: G = Games played; AB = At bats; H = Hits; Avg. = Batting average; HR = Home runs; RBI = Runs batted in

Pitching

Starting pitchers 
Note: G = Games pitched; IP = Innings pitched; W = Wins; L = Losses; ERA = Earned run average; SO = Strikeouts

Other pitchers 
Note: G = Games pitched; IP = Innings pitched; W = Wins; L = Losses; ERA = Earned run average; SO = Strikeouts

Relief pitchers 
Note: G = Games pitched; W = Wins; L = Losses; SV = Saves; ERA = Earned run average; SO = Strikeouts

Farm system

Notes

References 

1961 Los Angeles Angels team page at Baseball Reference
1961 Los Angeles Angels team page at www.baseball-almanac.com

Further reading

Los Angeles Angels seasons
Los Angeles Angels season
Inaugural Major League Baseball seasons by team